Muhammad Umer Chapra (born 1 February 1933) is a Pakistani-Saudi economist.  he serves as Advisor at the Islamic Research and Training Institute (IRTI) of the Islamic Development Bank (IDB) in Jeddah, Saudi Arabia. Prior to this position, he worked at the Saudi Arabian Monetary Agency (SAMA), Riyadh, for nearly 35 years, as Economic Advisor and then Senior Economic Advisor.

Personal life
Chapra was born in Bombay, British India on 1 February 1933 to Abdul Karim Chapra, and grew up in Karachi, Pakistan. He completed undergraduate studies from the University of Sindh in 1950, followed by undergraduate and postgraduate degrees in commerce at the University of Karachi in 1954 and 1956 respectively. He then moved to the United States, where he pursued a PhD in economics and sociology from the University of Minnesota in 1961, and worked as an academic for six years.

In 1965, at a time when there was high demand for skilled Pakistani migrants, he moved to Saudi Arabia after being offered an economic advisory position at the Saudi Arabian Monetary Agency. He worked under Minister for Finance Sheikh Mohammed Abalkhai during the reign of King Faisal, and played an instrumental role in building Saudi Arabia's banking system, as well as formulating the government's economic and monetary policies over the next several decades. In 1990, he was awarded the King Faisal International Prize in the field of Islamic studies and economics. He was also granted Saudi citizenship in recognition of his services to the country.

In 1995, he was awarded an Institute of Overseas Pakistanis medal by the President of Pakistan, for his contributions in economics. He is married to Khairunnisa Jamal Mundia and they have four children.

Awards
Chapra has received a number of awards for his academic contributions, including:

The Islamic Development Bank Award for Islamic Economics (1989).
The prestigious King Faisal International Prize for Islamic Studies (1989).
The IOP (Institute of Overseas Pakistanis) gold medal by the President of Pakistan for services to Islam and Islamic Economics at the First IOP Convention in Islamabad (1995).
The COMCEC 30th Anniversary Academic Award by the President of Turkey "for his outstanding academic studies in Islamic Economics and Finance" in Istanbul (2014).
Ranked by the ISLAMICA 500 among the Top 50 Global Leaders who make the Islamic Economy in 2015.

Bibliography
Chapra has written extensively on the issues of Islamic economics and finance. In addition to a number of articles published in accredited journals, he has written 11 books, of which the following have been the most notable:

 Towards a Just Monetary System
 Islam and the Economic Challenge
 The Future of Economics: An Islamic Perspective
 The Islamic Vision of Development in the Light of Maqasid Al-Shari'ah
 Muslim Civilization: The Causes of Decline and the Need for Reform
 Morality and Justice in Islamic Economics and Finance

References

External links 
 
 Chapra, M. U. "Islamic Economics: What It Is and How It Developed", EH.Net Encyclopedia, edited by Robert Whaples. Economic History Association, March 16, 2008.

1933 births
Living people
20th-century Muslim scholars of Islam
Academics from Karachi
Muhajir people
Naturalised citizens of Saudi Arabia
Pakistani economics writers
Pakistani economists
Pakistani emigrants to Saudi Arabia
Pakistani expatriates in the United States
Saudi Arabian economists
Scholars of Islamic banking
University of Karachi alumni
University of Kentucky faculty
University of Minnesota College of Liberal Arts alumni
University of Minnesota faculty
University of Sindh alumni
University of Wisconsin–Madison faculty